Interphon Records was a sub-label from Vee-Jay Records to distribute its European-leased masters in the US. It was active from 1964 until 1965.

The U.S. release of The Honeycombs 1964 hit "Have I the Right?" was released on Interphon.

References

See also
 List of record labels

American record labels
Record labels established in 1964
Record labels disestablished in 1965